This is a list of properties and districts in Jackson County, Georgia that are listed on the National Register of Historic Places (NRHP).

Current listings

|}

References

Jackson
Buildings and structures in Jackson County, Georgia